Ola Mikal Heide (born 26 April 1931) is a Norwegian botanist.

He was born in Trondenes. He graduated from the Norwegian College of Agriculture in 1961, and took the dr.agric. degree in 1967 with the thesis Studies on the Control of Regeneration in Begonia. He was appointed professor of plant physiology at the University of Tromsø in 1972, professor of botany at the Norwegian College of Agriculture in 1976. He served as rector there from 1978 to 1983. He is a fellow of the Norwegian Academy of Science and Letters.

References

1931 births
Living people
People from Harstad
20th-century Norwegian botanists
Norwegian College of Agriculture alumni
Academic staff of the Norwegian College of Agriculture
Rectors of the Norwegian University of Life Sciences
Academic staff of the University of Tromsø
Members of the Norwegian Academy of Science and Letters